The men's high jump at the 2022 World Athletics U20 Championships was held at Estadio Olímpico Pascual Guerrero on 2 and 5 August.

Records

Results

Qualification
The qualification round took place on 2 August, in two groups, both starting at 10:20 Athletes attaining a mark of at least 2.16 metres ( Q ) or at least the 12 best performers ( q ) qualified for the final.

Final
The final was held on 5 August at 15:21.

References

high jump
High jump at the World Athletics U20 Championships